The Uri B. Curtis House, at 169 Booker St. in Tonopah, Nevada, United States, was built in 1906.  It was listed on the National Register of Historic Places in 1982.

It was deemed significant for its association with businessman and mining investor Uri B. Curtis, who contributed to development of Tonopah by forming the Crystal Water Company that piped water to the growing town.  The house is a large stone residence built in a U-shape in the University Heights neighborhood.  It is uniquely designed.

See also 
Uri B. Curtis House/Tasker L. Oddie House, Ellis St., Tonopah, also NRHP-listed

References 

Houses completed in 1906
Houses on the National Register of Historic Places in Nevada
National Register of Historic Places in Tonopah, Nevada
Houses in Nye County, Nevada
1906 establishments in Nevada